Lake Stamford, a reservoir formed by Stamford Dam, is located  northeast of Stamford, Texas, in southeastern Haskell County. The City of Stamford owns the lake and half the water rights to Lake Stamford, while American Electric Power (AEP) owns the other half. The city also owns, operates, and maintains associated Stamford Dam.

Lake Stamford serves as the municipal water source for Stamford and the small neighboring communities of Lueders, Ericksdahl, Paint Creek, Sagerton, Avoca, and Corinth. For the lake's 60-year history, water levels have retained significant importance to these communities, providing them their sole source of water. Several notable rain events occurred in 1978 and 2005, resulting in record water levels. Recreational activities include boating, fishing, waterskiing, jet-skiing, and camping. Two marinas are on the lake: Stamford Marina on the south shore, and Anchor Marina on the north.

History

Except for a period from 1919 to 1941, droughts, fairly common in the area, occurred in 1885-87, 1896, 1910, 1918, 1943, and 1952-56. People and animals relied primarily on natural springs. These springs and spring-fed lakes supported a wide variety of animals. Buffalo, turkey, and ducks were abundant, particularly before 1875 when the buffalo slaughter began in Haskell County. At the mouth of Mule Creek was located the Blue Hole Springs. Area residents obtained water from these springs, and in the 1880s, M O Ranch had cattle pens there. As the water table fell due to irrigation pumping, an alternative was necessary. When the lake is nearing capacity, this area of former springs is under Lake Stamford.

When the City of Stamford was formed in 1900, two small reservoirs were built close to the city. Another was built in 1905, and a fourth was built in 1910, 5 miles west of the city. These small reservoirs grew insufficient for the growing town, and in 1919, the Clear Fork Brazos River was dammed just southeast of Lueders to form Lake Penick. By 1949, the city's water supply had become a significant concern for mayor A.C. Humphrey. Prospective area locations were surveyed, and all were rejected except for a site on Paint Creek.

Construction
Construction for Lake Stamford and Stamford Dam started July 14, 1951, and was completed in March 1953. Deliberate impoundment began in June 1953. Stamford Dam impounds Paint Creek, but numerous other creeks flow into the lake. Horse, Buffalo, and Mule Creeks all flow directly into the lake and are part of the watershed. The design engineer for the project was Freese and Nichols and the general contractor was L. & S. Contractor. The estimated cost of the dam was $289,365.00.

California Creek diversion project
At the height of the drought in 2000, a water diversion project on California Creek was built to divert future rainfall from the creek to Lake Stamford, in an effort to supplement the lake's primary inflow of Paint Creek. The project consisted of a channel dam, pump station, and pipeline, and cost an estimated $6.3 million. California Creek does not flow directly into Lake Stamford, but meets with Paint Creek one mile downstream (east) of Stamford Dam. Water is only diverted at sporadic intervals when there is sufficient flow in California Creek.

Climate

Water levels
Water levels in Lake Stamford fluctuate significantly, primarily due to extended periods of drought. These droughts steadily reduce the lake level throughout the year, and have ultimately resulted in two occasions when the lake was less than 20% full. The first drought event occurred in the late 1990s until November 2000. The second prolonged drought began July 2013 and ended June 2015. These droughts are usually only resolved after a substantially prolonged period of heavy rains. The lake commonly reaches full capacity with the help of a tropical system moving up from the Gulf of Mexico, as occurred in August 1978 with Tropical Storm Amelia and in August 2007 with Tropical Storm Erin. The amount of water is a key concern for area residents, for whom the lake is their sole source of water.

Record low levels
Since impoundment in June 1953 and initial filling, the lowest water level ever in Lake Stamford occurred on April 13, 2015.

Two prior periods of drought produced what were, at the time, record lows. The second-lowest water level occurred on four days in October 2000. The third-lowest lake level occurred on August 3, 1978, when the lake was 27.7% full.

Record high levels and cresting events

August 1978
Two days after recording its third-lowest level, the lake surged to its second-highest level ever. In fact, the rise was so fast. it took some three hours for the lake to simply fill to capacity by increasing almost . This was due to remnants of Tropical Storm Amelia. Though Amelia was weak and poorly organized, as it dissipated over Texas, it cause severe flooding.

That same day,  fell on nearby Albany, the record daily rainfall for the entire state of Texas. President Carter declared Haskell county, among counties in Texas, a disaster area. The lake receded down to the spillway by August 19, 1978.

August 2005
Since the drought in 2000, the lake has reached (and exceeded) capacity on three occasions. The first event happened very rapidly when, between August 13 and 16, 2005, the lake rose . During the month of August 2005, the City of Stamford received  of rain. Most of the rain was concentrated during the aforementioned four days, with the city receiving  on August 14, 2005, alone. This caused extensive flooding to more than 340 homes, resulting in a disaster area declaration by Governor Perry. Water levels dropped back below the spillway on November 28, 2005.

June and August 2007
The second event was not so much an event as a period. The preponderance of this period's rains were north and west of Stamford, near Haskell and Hamlin.

April 2010
Beginning the last week of January 2010, the area received two to three times its average monthly precipitation, and February had notable snowfall. This increased the lake by just under  by mid-March.

Water levels eventually dropped below the spillway on December 5, 2010, the last time Lake Stamford was full until July 10, 2015.

Sale of water to Tenaska
On July 12, 2011, the Stamford city council approved the sale of all "excess water" from Lake Stamford for use in Tenaska Energy's Trailblazer Energy Center in Nolan County, Texas. No public debate was held before the decision was made. This sale of water was fairly contentious among many area residents, who were not as confident as the city council that the lake could support such a significant new drain like a large power plant. The length of the contract (effective July 18, 2011) is either 30 years (starting when the plant begins operation) or 45 years from the date of the contract, whichever is earliest. Tenaska also has at its option two 10-year contract extensions, plus three additional 10-year extensions subject to approval of Stamford (which "shall not be unreasonably withheld").

Tenaska and its use of water is not subject to any water-conservation or drought-contingency plans enacted by Stamford. The proposed coal-fired power plant would be located 37 miles southwest of Stamford and 47 miles southwest of Lake Stamford.

On June 21, 2013, Tenaska cancelled their proposed Trailblazer coal-fired power plant. While Stamford would have provided the majority of the project's water, Tenaska was unable to find a secondary source of water.

Power plant

AEP (formerly West Texas Utilities) owns a gas-fired electric generating power plant located at Lake Stamford. The plant has a generating capacity of 218 MW. When operating, water is pumped directly from the lake for industrial (cooling) purposes. The plant was put into inactive status and mothballed in September 2002.

AEP holds half the water rights in Lake Stamford. AEP's water supply contract with Stamford expires September 16, 2041, but can be extended by AEP for one additional 10-year term.

Fish species
Lake Stamford provides angling opportunities with these species:

Bass
Largemouth Bass
White Bass
Catfish
Blue Catfish
Channel Catfish
Crappie and others
 Crappie
 Sunfish

See also
Tropical Storm Amelia (1978)#Northern Texas
Floods in the United States: 1901–2000#Tropical Storm Amelia floods of August 1978
2010–13 Southern United States drought

Gallery

References

External links

Texas Parks and Wildlife: Stamford Reservoir - fishing
Current water level for Lake Stamford
Water Data for Texas: Lake Stamford

Stamford
Dams in Texas
Dams completed in 1953
1953 establishments in Texas
Protected areas of Haskell County, Texas
Bodies of water of Haskell County, Texas
Tourist attractions in Haskell County, Texas
American Electric Power